Century Mill, Farnworth is a former cotton spinning mill in Farnworth, Bolton, Greater Manchester, England which was built in the early 20th century for ring spinning. It was taken over by the Lancashire Cotton Corporation in the 1930s and passed to Courtaulds in 1964. The  building is still in use for various other purposes in 2016.

History 
Century mill was built early in the 20th century, spinning 40's counts on ring frames for general-purpose work.

The cotton industry peaked in 1912 when it produced 8 billion yards of cloth. The Great War of 1914–1918 halted the supply of raw cotton, and the British government encouraged its colonies to build mills to spin and weave cotton. The war over, Lancashire never regained its markets and the independent mills were struggling. The Bank of England set up the Lancashire Cotton Corporation in 1929 to attempt to rationalise and save the industry. Century Mill, Farnworth was one of 104 mills bought by the LCC, and one of the 53 mills that survived through to 1950. In 2016 it was still standing and in use for non-textile purposes.

Architecture

Power 
The mill had a 1500 hp cross compound engine by Hick, Hargreaves & Co. Ltd. built in 1902 which operated at 190psi. The cylinders were  26"HP, 54"LP on a  stroke. The   flywheel drove 45 ropes at 59rpm.

Equipment 
 Ring frames

Owners
Lancashire Cotton Corporation (1930s–1964)
Courtaulds (1964–

See also 

Textile manufacturing

References

Bibliography

External links
 www.cottontown.org
 www.spinningtheweb.org.uk
Story of a half-timer Catherine Walton who started at Century mill aged 12 in 1917

Textile mills owned by the Lancashire Cotton Corporation
Textile mills in the Metropolitan Borough of Bolton
Farnworth